Lygniodes endoleucus is a moth of the family Erebidae. It is found in India, Thailand, Malaysia, Myanmar, Vietnam, India, China, Java, Sumatra and Sulawesi.

References

External links
Species info

Moths described in 1844
Lygniodes